Bulgaria competed at the 1992 Summer Paralympics in Barcelona, Spain. 7 competitors from Bulgaria won 3 medals made up of 1 gold and 2 silver and finished joint 38th in the medal table along with Panama.

See also 
 Bulgaria at the Paralympics
 Bulgaria at the 1992 Summer Olympics

References 

Bulgaria at the Paralympics
1992 in Bulgarian sport
Nations at the 1992 Summer Paralympics